The Norfolk Militia was formed under the Militia Act of 1757, replacing earlier less formal arrangements. From this date, better records were kept, and the men were selected by ballot to serve for longer periods. Proper uniforms and better weapons were provided, and the force was 'embodied' from time to time for training sessions.

In 1758 the Earl of Orford put the "Act for the better regulating of the Militia" into execution.  This set the number of men to serve in the militia in Norfolk at 960, with the city of Norwich providing 151.  The Norfolk Militia was divided into the 1st Battalion Western Regiment of the Norfolk Militia (West Norfolk Militia) and the 2nd Battalion Eastern Regiment of the Norfolk Militia (East Norfolk Militia).  Between 1797 and 1798 there was also a 3rd Battalion of the Norfolk Militia, but this was not re-raised in 1803.

The East Norfolk Militia was, jointly with the West Norfolk, the first regiment formed under the Bill of 1757, and was also recognised as the first to offer to "march wherever they might be most serviceable to the public defence."  Consideration was given by King George II "that every mark of his Royal Favour should be shown to this Corps" and that they "should be distinguished by the title of Militia Royal".

History
On 4 June 1759 the Eastern Battalion was reviewed by the Earl of Orford on Magdalen Fairstead, just outside Norwich. The event was reported in the press, with the conduct of the men being praised and a statement that the unit could now be ready to march given four days notice. The establishment of the unit was given as 1 Colonel, 1 Lt. Colonel, 1 Major, 11 Captains, 11 Lieutenants, 8 Ensigns, 1 Adjutant, 24 Sergeants, 24 drummers and 466 rank and file.

On Wednesday 4 July 1759 both battalions began a march from Norwich to Portsmouth barracks, to accept orders from Major General Holmes. Marching via Beccles, Ipswich, Colchester, Islington, and Petersfield, they arrived at Portsmouth on Tuesday 24 July. During the march, they were reviewed by King George II at Kensington Palace. Due to the heat, they set off soon after midnight, but were described as being in good spirits. By August the divisions were alternately guarding prisoners of war and undergoing training exercises.

The Militia moved around the country from this point; they were quartered in Cirencester on 5 July 1760, but moved back to guard prisoners in Norfolk in July. On 28 May 1761 King George awarded the two battalions of the Norfolk Militia a "Warrant for Colours".  In November the East Norfolk Militia was ordered to Fakenham, then to remain at Wells and Walsingham for the duration of the Fakenham Fair.

In 1759, "A Plan of Discipline Composed for the Use of the Militia of the County of Norfolk" was published by William Windham & George Townshend.  This text, written for the use of officers in this English rural militia unit, went on to become one of the most important drill manuals employed during the American Revolution.

Irish service
In September 1798 all of the officers and most of the rank and file volunteered for service in Ireland during the Rebellion.

Eight hundred men of the West Norfolk Militia were serving in Ireland in 1815 and 1816, and aspects of this were dramatised in the writings of George Borrow's book Lavengro, with Borrow's father having served as a Captain in the unit.

Prisoner shooting
In 1799 the East Norfolk Militia was escorting French prisoners of war from Yarmouth to Norman Cross. The bell tower of Dereham church was employed as a makeshift overnight cell for these prisoners. Jean De Narde, a 28-year lieutenant and son of a notary from St. Malo, escaped from the tower, but could not leave the churchyard due to posted sentries.

Being unable to escape, De Narde chose to hide in a tree; but his absence was noted and he was soon discovered by a sergeant. De Narde ignored orders to surrender and the sergeant shot him dead. The local people of Dereham were ashamed of this killing and a monument was built by public subscription.

A memorial service for Jean De Narde was held at Dereham church on 23 July 2016, including a re-enactment of the shooting and a minute's silence.  A short documentary on the subject of the shooting was released in 2017.

1805 invasion scare

In 1805, after Britain had declared war on France on 18 May 1803, Napoleon turned his attention to invading England, and started to assemble an expeditionary force at Boulogne. With the British Isles threatened with invasion, the Norfolk Militia were ordered to join the Southern District (Sussex), which covered Kent east of the River Cray and Holwood Hill; Sussex; and Tilbury Fort in Essex. The GOC was Gen Sir David Dundas, Lt Gen The Earl of Chatham. Headquarters were in Canterbury.

The East and West Norfolk Militia regiments were placed, along with the Nottinghamshire Regiment of Militia, into the Infantry Brigade of Maj Gen Alexander Mackenzie Fraser, headquartered in Winchelsea, with the 712 men of the West Norfolk Militia (under Lt Col George Nelthorpe) and 698 men of the East Norfolk Militia (under Lt Col George Berney Brograve, Bt.) being barracked at Clifford Camp.

POW duties and Norman Cross Depot

A purpose-built prisoner of war camp, the first of its type, was provided at Norman Cross, near Peterborough.  The Norfolk Militia became heavily involved in the transit of prisoners from Yarmouth to the camp, and in the operation of the latter.  Lieutenant Thomas Borrow of the West Norfolk Militia, father of author George Borrow, was quartered at Norman Cross from July 1811 to April 1813 and George spent his ninth and tenth years in the barracks there.

Disembodiment and peace
The Militia was disembodied at Great Yarmouth in 1814, and was not called out again until 1820.

In April 1853 612 men of the West Norfolk Militia, under Col. the Earl of Orford, mustered in Norwich at the Swan Hotel.  During this muster they were subjected to verbal attacks by members of the Peace Society and "Liberals".  571 out of the 612 men enrolled in the East Norfolk Militia assembled at Great Yarmouth on the same date under Col. the Hon. Berkeley Wodehouse.  It was noted that, “Their appearance was much more respectable than might have been expected, and many of those who were prepared to ridicule them acknowledged that they were a much better class than they expected.”

The East Norfolk Militia was presented with new colours on 16 May 1854, and these were still being carried in 1898. These were presented at a public ceremony held on South Denes, Great Yarmouth, that was attended by 10,000 persons, including civic dignitaries. The day concluded with a ball held at Great Yarmouth Town Hall, which had been decorated with the new colours, mirrors and stars formed of bayonets.

An order for the provision of Militia barracks at Great Yarmouth was made in 1853.  Originally it was intended to base all three regiments of the Norfolk Militia at Great Yarmouth, but on February 25 the original resolution was rescinded, and it was agreed “that the present Committee be empowered to receive estimates and tenders for building barracks for one regiment of Militia at Norwich, and for one regiment of Militia and one regiment of artillery at Yarmouth, on such plans as they may think best suited for the purpose.”   In 1855 it was noted that the government intended to convert the arsenal at Yarmouth to create Gorleston Barracks, a facility for the two field officers, 15 sergeants and 408 men of the East Norfolk Militia, with the old Great Yarmouth barracks having been converted into an Admiralty hospital.

In 1856, the East Norfolk Militia left Great Yarmouth by train, travelling to an encampment at Colchester. At Colchester railway station they were met by the band of the Royal Essex Rifles.  The strength at this time was recorded as 1 Major, 13 officers, 3 sergeants and 415 men.

June 1856 saw the left wing of the West Norfolk Militia return to Norwich from Fermoy, County Cork; the right wing reached the city on the 26th.

On April 23 the units at Colchester, including the East Norfolk Militia, were reviewed by Prince Albert, but June 4 saw orders issued for the East Norfolk Militia to return to Great Yarmouth for disembodiment.

On 20 May 1861, the East Norfolk Militia were involved in a serious military riot at Yarmouth, against men of the Royal Artillery. It was reported in the Norfolk Chronicle that this riot included the use of belts and stones, and that 200 Artillerymen, armed with swords and knives issued from the arsenal, had to be prevented from joining the fight by "persuasion and threats".  The report says that officers from both corps were involved in ending the riot, and that guards had to be placed on the bridge to keep the Artillery out of Yarmouth and the Militia from crossing into Southtown.

In 1878 the Dublin Daily reported that Sub-Lieutenant Hugh Lyle (Londonderry Light Infantry) would arrive in Dublin for the purpose of being attached to 1st Battalion East Norfolk Regiment in Richmond for one month's drill and instruction, in accordance with the Auxiliary Forces regulations.

Norfolk Artillery Militia 

In 1853 the Norfolk Militia Artillery was formed from detachments of West and East Norfolk Militia. 52 men transferred from the East Norfolk Militia.  The Norfolk Artillery Militia were assigned garrison duty at Eastbourne from March 7 - April 25, 1855. Their strength was increased from 200 to 400 men in May.

The Norfolk Artillery Militia were granted barracks in All Saints Green, Norwich from around 1860, these consisting of Ivory House, a parade ground and stables.  These barracks remained in use until the late 1920s

The Prince of Wales became Honorary Colonel of the Artillery Militia in 1871. In 1875 Royal assent was received to change the title of the Regiment to The Prince of Wales's Own Norfolk Artillery. The Great Yarmouth Assembly Rooms became frequently used as the Officer's Mess, whilst artillery practice was conducted on South Denes. In 1883 Lt. Colonel Lord Suffield and Major Edward Southwold Trafford purchased the building on behalf of the Artillery Militia, and the building remained under the Militia's ownership until 1918 (after which it became a Masonic Lodge).

In 1882, to align with the territorial designation of regular and auxiliary artillery units, the designation of the Corps was changed to Prince of Wales's Own 2nd Brigade, Eastern Division, Royal Artillery.

In 1901, during the Second Anglo-Boer War, five officers and 134 Other Ranks from the Prince of Wales's Own Norfolk Royal Garrison Artillery (Militia) were sent to Cape Town, from which they were split up for garrison duty on armoured trains Wasp, Challenger, Bulldog and Blackhalta, among other duties including Military Intelligence and escort duties for the Royal Engineers.  The Special Service Company of the Militia was commanded by Colonel Thomas Coke, 3rd Earl of Leicester, who had served in the Scots Guards until 1892.

Thorpe rail disaster, 1874
Two serving members of the West Norfolk Militia, Sgt Major Frederick Cassell and Sgt Robert Ward, are recorded to have been killed in the Thorpe rail accident whilst returning from a fishing trip. Their bodies were recovered and they were buried with full military honours. Robert Ward had previously been part of the Coldstream Guards.

Uniform
The uniform of the East Norfolk Militia was scarlet turned up with black. An early sketch by Lord Townshend, published in "A Plan of Discipline Composed for the Use of the Militia of the County of Norfolk" in 1759, shows a Private wearing a simple uniform of cocked hat, jacket, breeches and shoes worn without gaiters.  A cross belt and waist belt, with bayonet, are worn over the single-breasted jacket, with the latter secured by a single button close to the collar, two at the chest and three at the waist.

Long boots were discontinued, except for mounted officers, on 12 April 1814. On 22 June 1820 epaulettes, buttons and ornaments of dress were changed from gold to silver, although serving officers were permitted to retain their old style of uniform unless called on for actual service. In January 1831 the old uniform was finally discontinued, with orders that all uniforms must meet the latest King's Regulations and include black velvet and silver epaulettes.

Gold lace was restored to the East Norfolk Militia on 5 June 1882, at the same time as the badge of the then 4th Battalion Norfolk Regiment was changed from the castle and lion to the figure of Britannia.

Commanding officers

1st Battalion, West Norfolk Militia 
The following is a list of the known commanding officers of the West Norfolk Militia up to the 1881 re-organisation.
 George Townshend MP, 4th Viscount Townshend, Col. of the West Norfolk Militia from 1759.
 Horatio Walpole, 2nd Earl of Orford, Col. of the West Norfolk Militia from 1794 to 1822.
 Horatio Walpole, 3rd Earl of Orford, commanded the West Norfolk Militia from 1822 to 1858. 
 Lt. Col. and Hon. Col. Hambleton Francis Custance commanded in 1881.

2nd Battalion, East Norfolk Militia 
The following is a list of the commanding officers of the East Norfolk Militia up to the 1881 re-organisation.

 Sir Armine Wodehouse, 5th Baronet, Col. of the East Norfolk Militia from 1759
 George Walpole, 3rd Earl of Orford, Col. of the East Norfolk Militia from 1777
 Lt. Col. R. Ward took command 1792
 Hon. John Wodehouse, Lord Lieutenant of Norfolk, Col. of the East Norfolk Militia, took command 1798
 Lt. Col. Charles Lucas took command 1804.
 Lt. Col. J. Stanisforth Patteson took command 1806.
 Lt. Col. W. Durrant took command in 1808.
 Lt. Col. W. Mason took command 1824.
 Col. Sir E.H.K. Lacon took command in 1860
 Col. Charles Applewaite, took command in 1881.

3rd Battalion 
At this time no additional information has been found on this unit.

Prince of Wales Own Norfolk Artillery Militia 

  Lord Hastings served as Honorary Colonel of the Norfolk Artillery Militia.
 His Royal Highness, The Prince of Wales became Honorary Colonel of the Norfolk Artillery Militia in May 1872, the unit becoming the Prince of Wales Own Norfolk Artillery Militia in November 1875.

Notable members
 George Stracey Smyth, a Captain in the East Norfolk Militia and later Lieutenant-Governor of New Brunswick.
 Sir George Berney Brograve, 2nd Baronet, a Lieutenant Colonel in the Militia and High Sheriff of Norfolk in 1802.
 Major John Money, one of the earliest English aeronauts, making two ascents in 1785, and, in 1803, he advocated the use of balloons for military purposes.
Edwin Alfred Hervey Alderson, a Lieutenant in the Artillery Militia during 1876-78, later Lieutenant General commanding the Canadian Expeditionary Force in World War I.

Successor units
In 1881, following reorganisation of the British Army as part of the Childers Reforms, the West Norfolk Militia became the 3rd Battalion of the Norfolk Regiment, and the East Norfolk Militia became the 4th Battalion. Later titled the Royal Norfolk Regiment, it was amalgamated with the neighbouring Suffolk Regiment to form the 1st East Anglian Regiment. In 1964, the regiment became part of the Royal Anglian Regiment.

East Norfolk Militia (re-enactment group)

The East Norfolk Militia is a Napoleonic era re-enactment group, formed in 2000 to help celebrate the bicentenary of Horatio Nelson, 1st Viscount Nelson being awarded the Freedom of the borough of Great Yarmouth.  In 2005 they took part in events to mark the bicentenary of the Battle of Trafalgar at the Royal Norfolk Show. They perform ceremonial and guard duties for events in and around East Anglia. in addition to taking part in living history events, and took part in the bicentenary re-enactment of the Battle of Waterloo.

References

Bibliography
 
 
 
 Norman E.H. Litchfield, The Militia Artillery 1852–1909 (Their Lineage, Uniforms and Badges), Nottingham: Sherwood Press, 1987, .
 A general history of the County of Norfolk
 Norfolk and Norwich Remembrancer and Vade-mecum
 A Plan of Disciple composed for the use of the Militia of the County of Norfolk

External links
 Grave marker for James Randall, East Norfolk Regiment of Militia, 1858
 Painting of Sir Armine Wodehouse (1714–1777), MP, Colonel of the 2nd, or Eastern Regiment of Norfolk Militia, at a Review of his Regiment near Norwich (1759)
 Unknown officer of the Norfolk Militia
 Major Money (d.1817) and the Norfolk Militia
 Once Our Foe - The shooting of Jean DeNarde (documentary)

Military units and formations established in 1757
Military units and formations disestablished in 1881
Military units and formations in Norfolk
Royal Norfolk Regiment
History of the British Army
Norfolk